Diamond was launched in 1798 at Quebec. French privateers captured her three times, the third time retaining her. In between she carried slaves. Her third capture occurred while she was on a whaling voyage. Her last voyage took her from Île de France to Bordeaux where she was decommissioned in January 1809.

British career
Diamond was the first 500-ton (bm) vessel built at Quebec since the British occupation. 

Diamond entered Lloyd's Register in 1800 with Anderson, master, Beatson, owner, and trade London-Halifax.

The French privateer Grand Décidé captured "The Diamond Transport, from Halifax to Portsmouth" around end-October 1800. On 1 November the Royal Navy Cutter Viper recaptured Diamond. Viper sent Diamond into Falmouth, where she arrived on 3 November.

In 1801 Diamonds ownership changed. The entry in Lloyd's Register is illegible, but the entry in the 1802 issue shows her master as Clark, her owner as Parry & Co., and her trade as London-Africa.

On 24 August 1801 Captain James Clark received a letter of marque. Diamond then made two slave trading voyages under Clark. 

1st slave voyage (1801–1802): Diamond left London on 31 August 1801.  She then delivered 391 slaves to Trinidad, where she arrived on 1 March 1802. She returned to London on 13 June.

2nd slave voyage (1802–1803): Diamond left London on 13 September. She arrived at Havana, Cuba, on 1 April 1803. There she landed 389 slaves. As Diamond was returning from Havana on 9 August she encountered the French privateer , which took her captive. However,  recaptured Diamond on the 12th and sent her into The Downs. A few days later Diamond ran on shore a few miles below Gravesend and bilged. Diamond arrived back in London on 31 August.

Next, Diamond became a whaling ship for J. Hill & Co. with destination the South Seas. Captain Mark Munro (or Monro) received a letter of marque on 31 August 1804, and sailed her from Britain on 17 September 1804 with destination Isle of Desolation. She was at Desolation on 25 February 1805. She was also reported to have been "all well" there on 5 May.

On 10 November, the French privateer Napoléon captured Diamond in the Mozambique Channel, after a three-day chase. Then on 10 December Napoléon captured . The capture occurred off Cape Agulhas as Hercules was returning to England from Bombay, and Napoléon sent her into Port Louis. At her capture, Hercules was carrying a cargo of cotton.. In November 1805, Napoléon brought the prisoners from Hercules and from Diamond into the Cape Colony, then in Dutch hands. There Alex Tennant, resident in the Cape, arranged at his own expense for the prisoners to be sent to St Helena. The Danish ship Beshriermerin arrived at St Helena on 6 January 1806 with the British crews.

French career
The French renamed Diamond Diamant. An ambiguous report has "The Napoleon, prize of the Diamant, consignees of the Lenouvelle brothers, three masted vessel, of about 400 tons, copper-lined, to be sold 5 April [1806] by notary Guérin."

At Île de France the French commissioned Diamant in September 1808 under the command of Captain Joseph Potier "en guerre et en marchandises", that is an armed merchantman that was also authorised to take prizes should the opportunity arise. In mid-October, Diamant left Mauritius, bound for Lorient. She arrived in Quiberon Bay in the evening of 21 January 1809 and ran into the British blockade; a frigate gave chase, but Potier managed to escape by throwing his artillery overboard. Diamant arrived off Bordeaux on the 23rd, where a storm forced Potier to cut down her masts to save the ship; he finally arrived in Bordeaux harbour on the 25th. She was decommissioned after her arrival at Bordeaux in January 1809.

Notes, citations, and references
Notes

Citations

References
 
 
 
 
 
 

1798 ships
Age of Sail merchant ships
Merchant ships of the United Kingdom
London slave ships
Whaling ships
Captured ships
Merchant ships of France